Statistics of 1. deild in the 1997 season.

Overview
It was contested by 10 teams, and B36 Tórshavn won the championship.

League standings

Results
The schedule consisted of a total of 18 games. Each team played two games against every opponent in no particular order. One of the games was at home and one was away.

Top goalscorers
Source: faroesoccer.com

24 goals
 Uni Arge (HB)

16 goals
 Henning Jarnskor (GÍ)
 John Petersen (B36)

12 goals
 Kurt Mørkøre (KÍ)

10 goals
 Pól Thorsteinsson (VB)

9 goals
 Heðin á Lakjuni (KÍ)

8 goals
 Gunnar Mohr (HB)
 Jens Kristian Hansen (B36)
 Julian Johnsson (B36)
 Óli Johannesen (B36)
 Óli Hansen (NSÍ)

References

1. deild seasons
Faroe
Faroe
1